USS Drayton (DD-23) was a  in the United States Navy. She was the first ship named for Captain Percival Drayton.

Drayton was launched on 22 August 1910 by Bath Iron Works, Bath, Maine, sponsored by Miss E. G. Drayton, niece of Captain Drayton, and commissioned on 29 October 1910.

Service history

Pre-World War I
Drayton arrived at Key West, Florida on 21 December 1910, to cruise in Cuban waters and on the east coast in exercises and development problems. She sailed from Key West on 9 April 1914 to serve on blockade duty off Mexico and take refugees out of the troubled areas, returning to New York on 1 June, and to Newport on 1 August.

World War I
Drayton served on neutrality patrol and conducted torpedo and gunnery exercises out of Newport, Rhode Island and in the Caribbean. Calling at Jacksonville, Florida from 5–11 April 1917, she took over the German steamer Frieda Leonhardt and interned her crew in accordance with a Presidential proclamation issued upon American entry into World War I. Drayton arrived at Norfolk, Virginia on 12 April, and the next day reported for duty with the Patrol Force off the east coast serving until 4 May, when she entered Boston Navy Yard to fit out for distant service.

Drayton departed Boston, Massachusetts on 21 May, and sailed by way of St. John's, Newfoundland to Queenstown, Ireland, arriving on 1 June. She patrolled along the coast of Ireland, escorting both inbound and outbound ships. On 20 June, she searched for the submarine which had torpedoed , then rescued 42 survivors who were landed at Bantry, Ireland. From 26 June-4 July, she escorted a transport convoy to St. Nazaire and took part in a submarine hunt with two French cruisers.

Transferred to Brest and United States Naval Forces Operating in European Waters, Drayton left Queenstown on 15 February 1918. She continued her escort and antisubmarine operations out of this port until 16 December, when she sailed for the United States, arriving at Boston on 2 January 1919 for overhaul. Drayton cruised along the east coast on various exercises and maneuvers until 18 July, when she reported to Philadelphia Navy Yard in company with seven other destroyers destined for decommissioning.

Drayton was decommissioned on 17 November. On 1 July 1933, her name was dropped and she was known as DD-23 until sold on 28 June 1935.

References

Paulding-class destroyers
World War I destroyers of the United States
Ships built in Bath, Maine
1910 ships